Paulo Abdala Airport  is the airport serving Francisco Beltrão, Brazil.
 
It is operated by the Municipality of Francisco Beltrão under the supervision of Aeroportos do Paraná (SEIL).

History
The new passenger terminal was commissioned on November 9, 2010.

Airlines and destinations
No scheduled flights operate at this airport.

Access

See also

List of airports in Brazil

References

External links

Airports in Paraná (state)
Francisco Beltrão